Ranadheera Kantheerava is a 1960 Kannada-language historical drama biographical film directed by the editor-turned-director N. C. Rajan and written by G. V. Iyer. It is one of the most popular films of acclaimed Kannada actor Rajkumar, who plays the role of an emperor Kanthirava Narasaraja I of the Wodeyar dynasty, Mysore who was fondly named as Ranadheera Kantheerava. The film depicts the life of Kantheerava, who is known for his immense physical strength through wrestling. The movie was credited to be one of the most authentic historical films made  since it was entirely based on the documents found in the Mysore Palace. The film also stars Udaykumar, Balakrishna, Leelavathi, Narasimharaju and Sandhya in the prominent roles.

The film was released at a time during the severe crisis in the Kannada film industry due to the financial constraints. This film was produced through a co-operative forum called Kannada Chalanachitra Kalavidara Sangha formed by actors Rajkumar, Balakrishna, Narasimharaju and acclaimed writer G. V. Iyer. Thus this was the first venture where Rajkumar turned producer for the film. Post release, the film suffered an initial hitch as no distributor came forward to screen the film. Later it was released in a single theatre - Bharath and found huge collections. The film is considered the first blockbuster of Kannada cinema. This film was screened at IFFI 1992.

Cast

 Rajkumar as Kantheerava
 R. Nagendra Rao as Dalavayi Vikrama Raya
 Udaykumar
 Balakrishna
 Leelavathi
 Sandhya
 Narasimharaju
 H. M. S. Shastry
 K. S. Ashwath
 Veerabhadrappa
 Kantha Rao
 Papamma
 G. V. Iyer
 Ramadevi
 Radha
 Saroja
 Eshwarappa

Historical Significance
Narasaraja Wodeyar I (1638 - 1659) popularly known as Ranadheera Kantheerava was an emperor in the royal Mysuru dynasty. He was a man of immense physical strength and was known as an intense wrestler in the Kingdom. He was an exponent in a form of wrestling called Vajra Mushti.  He was also a musician with a strong liking towards arts and literature. He used the Srirangapatna town as his capital. Soon after his death in 1659, all his 10 wives committed Sati and ended their lives.

Cultural Significance
This film is credited to have spurred the Kannada cinema industry in the direction of historicals. This was produced as a joint venture under at a time when the Kannada cinema industry was facing severe financial crises and its enormous success is reported to have not only re-instilled confidence in the Kannada cinema industry but inspired other historicals in quick succession. Even today, it stands as a sort of guidepost to making compelling historical dramas in Kannada. The chief merit of Ranadheera Kanteerva is the level of authenticity in several key aspects. The first is the Kannada language used during Kanteerava Narasaraja Wodeyar's days - both by the royalty and the common people. To a keen student of the inflections that Kannada has undergone, this forms a useful study. Equally authentic are the depictions of the protocol, manners, customs, and traditions of palace life. The movie also brings out a few nuances of palace intrigue, tangentially touches upon some aspects of the administrative machinery and the system of espionage by weaving them together in a rather dramatic fashion.
This level of detail was made possible due to extensive research and first hand knowledge of the Mysore palace life that the film's writer Sri G.V. Iyer possessed.

Soundtrack

Ranadheera Kantheerava soundtrack consists of 7 songs all composed by G. K. Venkatesh and written by G. V. Iyer.

See also
 Kanthirava Narasaraja I
 Wadiyar dynasty

References

External links
 
  K. Moti Gokulsing, Routledge Handbook of Indian Cinemas 

1960 films
1960s Kannada-language films
1960s historical drama films
1960s biographical drama films
Indian black-and-white films
Indian epic films
Indian biographical drama films
Historical epic films
Indian war drama films
War epic films
Films based on Indian novels
Films set in Karnataka
Films set in ancient India
Films set in the 17th century
History of India on film
Films scored by G. K. Venkatesh
1960 drama films
Indian historical drama films